Norma: International Journal for Masculinity Studies is a quarterly academic journal in the field of masculinity studies, published by Routledge. It was established in 2006 as the Nordic Journal for Masculinity Studies, a joint effort of the masculinities studies research communities in Denmark, Finland, Iceland, Norway, and Sweden. It was published by Universitetsforlaget until it was acquired by Routledge in 2014 and obtained its current title.

The editors-in-chief are Lucas Gottzén (Linköping University) and Ulf Mellström (Karlstad University).

External links
 
Volumes 2006–2013 published by Universitetsforlaget

Men's studies journals
Masculinity
Taylor & Francis academic journals
Publications established in 2006
Quarterly journals